Qahavand (also Romanized as Qahāvand and Qahāwand) is a city and capital of Shara District, in Hamadan County, Hamadan Province, Iran. At the 2006 census, its population was 2,407, in 616 families.

References

Populated places in Hamadan County
Cities in Hamadan Province